Austin F. Cushman (June 18, 1830 – November 29, 1914) invented the self-centering Cushman universal chuck in 1862; his father-in-law, Simon Fairman, had previously invented the lathe chuck.

Biography
He was born on June 18, 1830, in Belchertown, Massachusetts. He died on November 29, 1914, in Hartford, Connecticut.

See also
 Simon Fairman

References

1830 births
1914 deaths
19th-century American inventors